Shaun Michael Fleming (born May 31, 1987) is an American musician and actor. He is best known as the former live drummer of the indie rock band Foxygen and the creator of his solo project Diane Coffee as well as his Disney voice acting career.

Acting career
Fleming began his career starring in the independent film Operation Splitsville (1999) which led to his first role for the Walt Disney Corporation as Max Goof in the film Mickey's Once Upon a Christmas.

Fleming continued his career primarily as a voice actor, appearing as a regular on Kim Possible between 2002 and 2006, where he played the twin brothers Jim and Tim Possible for the first three seasons, and Lilo & Stitch: The Series where he played Keoni Jameson. In 2003, Fleming landed his first full-length feature Jeepers Creepers 2, where he played the young farm boy, Billy, who was abducted in the opening scenes of the film. In 2004, Fleming would reprise his leading role as Leonard Amadeus Helperman for the animated feature Teacher's Pet. In 2008, Fleming played Jimmy Livingston in Bubble Boy: The Musical, a stage adaptation of the 2001 film Bubble Boy.

Music career
Fleming, a childhood friend of the experiment rock duo Foxygen, joined the group as the live drummer, beginning with tours promoting the band's album We Are the 21st Century Ambassadors of Peace & Magic (2012). Fleming released a solo EP, entitled Thank You, in 2011.

Diane Coffee
In 2012, Fleming left Agoura Hills for New York and while still touring with Foxygen, began writing and recording what would become the debut Diane Coffee LP My Friend Fish. Though his means were limited (recording a makeshift drum set with his iPhone voice memo app, using detuned guitars in lieu of a bass), he was able to complete the album in just shy of two weeks. The album was released on October 29, 2013, via record label Western Vinyl.

The live band behind the 2013–2014 My Friend Fish tours usually consisted of Joey Lefitz on drums, Jared Walker on guitar, Emily Panic on bass, and Steve Okonski on Keys. One 2014 tour featured Spencer Klein on drums.

Diane Coffee was featured on the song "Crown" by Run the Jewels, which appears on their 2014 album Run the Jewels 2.

A follow-up album Everybody's a Good Dog LP was released in 2015.

In the spring of 2019 Fleming released Internet Arms on Polyvinyl and subsequently toured the U.S. His touring band for the summer of 2019 featured Sam Bryson on drums, Kyle Paul on guitar, Aidan Epstein on bass, and Matt Romy on keyboards.

Fleming is based in Bloomington, Indiana.

Discography

Early works
 Thank You EP (2011)

with Diane Coffee
 My Friend Fish LP (2013)
 Run the Jewels 2 - "Crown" (feat. Diane Coffee) (2014)
 Everybody's a Good Dog LP (2015)
 Internet Arms LP (2019)
The Letdown - single (2020)
 With People LP (2022)

Filmography
Films
Cry-Baby (1990)
Operation Splitsville (1999) – Ernie
Mickey's Once Upon a Christmas (1999) – Young Max Goof
Spot's Musical Adventures (2000)
Jeepers Creepers 2 (2003) – Billy Taggart
Teacher's Pet (2004) – Leonard Amadeus Helperman
The Lion King 1½ (2004) – The Lost Boys
Mickey's Twice Upon a Christmas (2004) – Young Max Goof

Television
Cyberkidz (1996) – Kyle Cooper
Teacher's Pet (2000–02) – Leonard Amadeus Helperman
The Legend of Tarzan (2001) – Young Tarzan
Kim Possible (2002–06) – Tim Possible, Jim Possible
Fillmore! (2002–04) – B.A.G.A.S.T. Wimp, Haughty Drama Club Student, Kid, Nervous Kid, Proper Kid, Seller, Seth, Skate Rat, Team Member #1, Texas, Theldin Fryburger, Thug #1, Unlucky Golfer, Vendor, Weaselly Geek Kid, Wheels
Lilo & Stitch: The Series (2003–06) – Keoni Jameson
Kim Possible: A Sitch in Time (2003) – Tim Possible, Jim Possible
Kim Possible: So the Drama (2005) – Tim Possible, Jim Possible

Shorts
Adventures in Odyssey: Escape from the Forbidden Matrix (2000) – Sal Martinez

Games
Walt Disney World Quest: Magical Racing Tour (2000) – Ned Shredbetter, Baron Karlott, X.U.D. 71, Oliver Chickley III
The Lion King: Simba's Mighty Adventure – Young Simba 
Monsters, Inc. Scream Team (2001) – Nerves
Kingdom Hearts (2002) – Tidus
Kingdom Hearts Re:coded (2010) – Tidus
Kingdom Hearts HD 1.5 Remix (2013) – Tidus

References

External links

1987 births
Living people
American male child actors
American male film actors
American male voice actors
American male video game actors
Glam rock musicians
20th-century American male actors
21st-century American male actors
21st-century American singers
21st-century American male singers
Musicians from California
Western Vinyl artists